The 9mm Glisenti is an Italian pistol and submachine gun cartridge.

History and usage
The 9mm Glisenti was developed for the Italian Glisenti Model 1910 pistol, first used in World War I. It was also used in other Italian weapons such as the Beretta Model 1915 and Beretta M1923 pistols, the OVP and Beretta Model 1918 submachine guns, and the Villar-Perosa aircraft submachine gun.  The Medusa M47 revolver can also fire 9mm Glisenti ammunition along with many other .38 and 9 mm cartridges.

Specifications
The cartridge was based on the German 9×19mm Parabellum; in fact, both cartridges are dimensionally identical. However, the powder charge of the 9mm Glisenti cartridge is reduced compared to a typical 9×19mm cartridge, making it significantly less powerful, as it is also meant to be used in blowback pistols, which are easier and less expensive to manufacture than locked breech firearms. This means that 9mm Glisenti cartridges will chamber and fire in 9×19mm firearms, at the risk of not cycling properly and causing malfunctions, but it also means that 9×19mm cartridges will chamber and fire in 9mm Glisenti, presenting a significant risk of catastrophic failure to the firearm, and a risk of injury to the shooter.

The cartridge is now obsolete, but Fiocchi Munizioni occasionally produces batches.

References

 
Pistol and rifle cartridges